Dodia verticalis is a moth of the family Erebidae. It was described by J. Donald Lafontaine and James T. Troubridge in 2000. It is found in Canada (Yukon). The habitat consists of dry, rocky tundra.

The forewings have dark transverse bands meeting at the posterior margin at right angles.

References

Callimorphina
Moths of North America
Endemic fauna of Canada
Endemic fauna of Yukon